Tenaturris concinna is a species of sea snail, a marine gastropod mollusk in the family Mangeliidae.

Description
The length of the shell varies between 6 mm and 12 mm.

(Original description) The fusiform shell is white, tinged more or less with reddish brown. It shows numerous crowded small ribs, which become obsolete near the outer lip, and crowded spiral striae, which are finer on the spire. The: apex is cute. The spire shows moderately convex outlines:. The shell contains eight whorls. These are angular along the middle, with a moderately impressed suture. The  aperture is very long and narrow. The outer lip is very much thickened a little behind the edge, with the sinus deep and very near the suture. The siphonal canal is scarcely distinct from the aperture.

Distribution
This species occurs in the Pacific Ocean off Panama.

References

External links
 
 

concinna
Gastropods described in 1852
Taxa named by Charles Baker Adams